Yooka may refer to:
Yooka, a character in Yooka-Laylee
 Yooka, a character in Season 3 of Drake & Josh